St Andrew's Church is a heritage-listed church building located at Rangi Ruru in Christchurch, New Zealand. It was the first Presbyterian church to built in Christchurch. It is registered as a "Historic Place  – Category I " by Heritage New Zealand. The building was designed in the Gothic Revival style and was first opened for worship on 1 February 1857.

History 

In 1854 a committee was set up to establish a Presbyterian church for Christchurch. The committee was granted a plot of land on the corner of Tuam and Oxford terrace from the Government. The committee also requested a minister be sent form Scotland. Charles Fraser was chosen and arrived in Christchurch in 1856. The original church was designed by the architect Henry John Cridland.

The building was modified and enlarged a number of times between 1862 and 1986. The first addition happened around 1862 when a nave was added. At this time the original building was divided into two halves with a new nave being built between the two halves. This turned the original buildings two halves into the transepts of the now larger church. A further addition was made between 1892 and 1893 when the nave was widened to allow for more seating. The church moved from its original site opposite the Christchurch Hospital in 1986 when it moved to its current home in the grounds of Rangi Ruru School.

Heritage listing 
On 7 April 1983, the church was registered by the New Zealand Historic Places Trust as a Category I historic place, with the registration number being 304.

References 

Gothic Revival church buildings in New Zealand
Churches in Christchurch
Heritage New Zealand Category 1 historic places in Canterbury, New Zealand
Churches completed in 1957
2011 Christchurch earthquake
Listed churches in New Zealand
1850s architecture in New Zealand
Presbyterian churches in New Zealand